Guld, platina & passion is an album by Swedish singer Carola Häggkvist. It was released in May 2003 in Sweden and Norway. On the album charts, the album peaked at number one in Sweden and number 5 in Norway. The album stayed on the album chart in Sweden for 67 weeks and sold 4× platinum.

Track listing
 När löven faller
 Säg mig var du står
 Främling
 Mickey
 Liv
 Gloria
 Tommy tycker om mig
 Det regnar i Stockholm
 Tokyo
 Ännu en dag
 På egna ben
 Hunger
 The Runaway
 Brand New Heart
 Radiate
 Mitt i ett äventyr
 All the Reasons to Live
 If I Can Dream
 Every Beat of My Heart
 The Girl Who Had Everything
 Fångad av en stormvind
 Save the Children
 My Tribute
 Guld i dina ögon
 Så länge jag lever
 The Sound of Music
 Modersvingen
 Himlen i min famn
 Thula Sana
 Jag vill alltid älska
 The Light
 I Believe in Love (radio hitvision remix)
 Walk a Mile in My Shoes

Release history

Charts

References

2003 albums
Carola Häggkvist albums